The SIAI S.8 was an Italian 1910s two-seat reconnaissance flying boat.

Design and development
The Societa Idrovolanti Alta Italia (SIAI) was formed in 1915 initially to build French flying boats under license. The company employed Raffaele Conflenti as chief designer and his first design was the SIAI S.8, a two-seat equal-span biplane flying boat, first flown in 1917. The Royal Italian Navy ordered 800 S.8s, to be built by SIAI and subcontractors. With the end of the war, production was stopped when 172 aircraft had been delivered. Early aircraft were powered by an Isotta Fraschini V4B engine, later aircraft had the more powerful 220 hp (164 kW) Hispano-Suiza 44.

Operational history
The aircraft equipped five squadrons of the Regia Marina. By 1920 only 63 aircraft survived, mostly in storage.

Operators

Regia Marina

Specifications (S.8)

See also

References

S.08
1910s Italian military reconnaissance aircraft
Flying boats
Military aircraft of World War I
Biplanes
Single-engined pusher aircraft
Aircraft first flown in 1917